Lives on Fire is an American reality documentary television series on the Oprah Winfrey Network that debuted on June 8, 2012.

The network ordered a six episode first season of the series which was completely produced and finished. The series premiered with 163,000 viewers and the following episode obtaining 121,000 viewers. Citing low viewership, OWN pulled the series from its broadcasting schedule and the remaining episodes of the series were burned off on July 20, 2012.

Premise
The series follows four female firefighters as they battle out the drama, action and danger of their jobs while they respond to life and death situations.

Cast
 Nica Vasquez
 Rosanne Grier
 Michele Dyck
 Diley Greiser

Episodes

References

External links
 
 

2010s American reality television series
2012 American television series debuts
2012 American television series endings
English-language television shows
Oprah Winfrey Network original programming